The Pike National Forest is located in the Front Range of Colorado, United States, west of Colorado Springs including Pikes Peak. The forest encompasses 1,106,604 acres (4,478 km2) within Clear Creek, Teller, Park, Jefferson, Douglas and El Paso counties. The major rivers draining the forest are the South Platte and Fountain Creek. Rampart Reservoir is a large artificial body of water located within the forest.

The forest is named after American explorer Zebulon Pike.

Much of the bedrock within Pike National Forest is made up of the coarse, pink to orange Pikes Peak granite.

Administration
Pike National Forest is managed in association with San Isabel National Forest and Comanche National Grassland in Colorado, as well as Cimarron National Grassland in Kansas and is headquartered in Pueblo, Colorado. There are local ranger district offices located in Colorado Springs, Fairplay and Morrison.

Forest fires

The dry climate of Pike National Forest makes it prime wildfire territory. The first recorded fires occurred in the 19th century. The forest was recently the location of the Hayman Fire in 2002 and the Waldo Canyon Fire in 2012. The former burned  and 133 homes  while the latter burned  and 346 homes.

The Pike and San Isabel National Forest was recently awarded a major reclamation project to fix the damage from the Hayman wildfire. The project was sponsored by The National Arbor Day Foundation, in conjunction with several university bookstores. Pike and San Isabel was voted the winner from a group of three separate forests. The vote took place at www.buildaforest.com. The school that placed the most votes for Pike and San Isabel National Forest was the University of Central Florida; the Pike and San Isabel National Forest will be a given a name honoring the effort by UCF students, alumni, and supporters.

Wilderness areas
There are three officially designated wilderness areas lying within Pike National Forest that are part of the National Wilderness Preservation System. Two of them extend into neighboring National Forests (as indicated).
 Buffalo Peaks Wilderness, 67.83 square miles (partly in San Isabel NF)
 Lost Creek Wilderness, 187 square miles
 Mount Evans Wilderness, 116.3 square miles (mostly in Arapaho NF)

Climate
Most of the forest experiences a Highland climate with warm summers and cold winters. Even in the summer, nights are cool due to the forest's high elevation. Temperatures and precipitation vary widely throughout the forest, depending on elevation. Most of the forest receives more than 100 inches of snow a year.

See also
United States Army Pike’s Peak Research Laboratory
Devil's Head Lookout
Culturally modified trees
Barr Trail

References

External links

Pike and San Isabel National Forests and Cimarron and Comanche National Grasslands (United States Forest Service)

 
National Forests of Colorado
National Forests of the Rocky Mountains
Protected areas of Clear Creek County, Colorado
Protected areas of Teller County, Colorado
Protected areas of Park County, Colorado
Protected areas of Jefferson County, Colorado
Protected areas of Douglas County, Colorado
Protected areas of El Paso County, Colorado
Pikes Peak
Protected areas established in 1892
1892 establishments in Colorado